In graph theory, a branch of mathematics, the rank of an undirected graph has two unrelated definitions.  Let  equal the number of vertices of the graph.

 In the matrix theory of graphs the rank  of an undirected graph is defined as the rank of its adjacency matrix.  
Analogously, the nullity of the graph is the nullity of its adjacency matrix, which equals .

 In the matroid theory of graphs the rank of an undirected graph is defined as the number , where  is the number of connected components of the graph. Equivalently, the rank of a graph is the rank of the oriented incidence matrix associated with the graph.
Analogously, the nullity of the graph is the nullity of its oriented incidence matrix, given by the formula , where n and c are as above and m is the number of edges in the graph. The nullity is equal to the first Betti number of the graph. The sum of the rank and the nullity is the number of edges.

Examples 
A sample graph and matrix:

(corresponding to the four edges, e1–e4):

In this example, the matrix theory rank of the matrix is 4, because its column vectors are linearly independent.

See also 
 Circuit rank
 Cycle rank
 Nullity (graph theory)

Notes

References
.
Hedetniemi, S. T., Jacobs, D. P., Laskar, R. (1989), Inequalities involving the rank of a graph. Journal of Combinatorial Mathematics and Combinatorial Computing, vol. 6, pp. 173–176.
Bevis, Jean H., Blount, Kevin K., Davis, George J., Domke, Gayla S., Miller, Valerie A. (1997), The rank of a graph after vertex addition. Linear Algebra and its Applications, vol. 265, pp. 55–69. 

Algebraic graph theory
Graph connectivity
Graph invariants